J'en ai marre may refer to:

Songs
J'en ai marre!, Alizée
"J'en ai marre", song by Arletty A. Willemetz, G. Arnould, M. Yvain	1956 covered by Colette Ritz	1967
"J'en ai marre", song by Eddie Constantine	Y. Samuel, J. Davis 1959
"J'en ai marre", single by Johnny Hallyday Eric Bamy, Michel Mallory from Pas Facile 1981
"J'en ai marre", song by Patrick Bruel
"J'en ai marre", song by Adam Cohen
"J'en ai marre", song by Mistinguett
"J'en ai marre", song by Najat Aatabou
"J'en ai marre", song by Sarane Ferret
"J'en ai marre", song by Awilo Longomba
"J'en ai marre", song by Sarcloret
"J'en ai Marre", song by Hugues Le Bars used in ice-dance routine of Gwendal Peizerat and Marina Anissina